whitehouse.gov (also simply known as wh.gov) is the official website of the White House and is managed by the Office of Digital Strategy. It was launched in 1994 by the Clinton administration. The content of the website is in the public domain or licensed under Creative Commons Attribution license.

Content
The content of the White House website is designed to be an open portfolio for the public to know the current operations of the president during their presidency. The website contains information about the president, the vice president, their families, press releases, proclamations, executive orders, and a transcript of speeches by White House officials.

The website also provides information about the current issues the president and vice president address (like education, healthcare, etc.), also providing information about the history of the White House building, Air Force One, and Camp David. The website also reviews the structure of the federal government of the United States, including details about state and local government, along with voting and elections.

The website also offers information about getting involved with the White House. This includes directions on how to write or call the White House, as well as details about the White House Internship Program and the White House Fellows Program.

The site also contains information about the current Cabinet of the United States and the Executive Office of the President of the United States.

Site's difference in each administration 
After a new administration is sworn in on Inauguration Day, the website is immediately redesigned for the new administration. Past administration websites are archived by the National Archives. 

List of prior whitehouse.gov websites:
 https://clintonwhitehouse5.archives.gov
 https://georgewbush-whitehouse.archives.gov
 https://obamawhitehouse.archives.gov
 https://trumpwhitehouse.archives.gov

Civic engagement

On September 1, 2011, David Plouffe, Senior Advisor to the President of the United States to Barack Obama, announced in an email that the White House is releasing "We the People", an online platform for the public to create petitions to the US Government. The launch of the petitioning platform was announced by Katelyn Sabochik on September 22, 2011 in a White House blog post.

On December 19, 2017, the Trump administration announced its intention to temporarily shut down the platform and replace it with a "new platform [that] would save taxpayers more than $1m a year", though ultimately it was retained in its initial form. On January 20, 2021, the day of the inauguration of Joe Biden, the platform started redirecting to the main whitehouse.gov domain, marking the discontinuance of the feature by the incoming administration. It has not been relaunched since.

Platform 

In July 2001, the White House started switching their web servers to an operating system based on Red Hat Linux and using the Apache HTTP Server. The installation was completed in February 2009. In October 2009, the White House web servers adopted Drupal, a free and open-source content management system, which runs on Red Hat Enterprise Linux.

In December 2017, the Trump administration launched a redesigned website which it claimed would save taxpayers "almost $3 million per year".

See also
 Whitehouse.com, a former adult website
 Whitehouse.org, a parody website
 List of websites founded before 1995
 1600 Pennsylvania Ave

Notes
 A Spanish version of whitehouse.gov is currently available under the Biden Administration and was also used during the Bush and Obama administrations. During the Trump Administration, the Spanish version of whitehouse.gov was removed. There is also archived Spanish versions of the website from the Bush and Obama administrations.

 The Clinton version of the site was archived several times during the administration and this is last archive of the site. Other versions can be found by changing the id in the URL between 1 and 5.

References

External links

 
 Archived Presidential White House Websites from the National Archives and Records Administration
 Archived versions of the site during the Clinton administration
 Archived versions of the site during the Bush administration
 Archived versions of the site during the Obama administration
 Archived versions of the site during the Trump administration

Government services web portals in the United States
Internet properties established in 1994
Presidency of the United States
Creative Commons-licensed works
1994 establishments in Washington, D.C.
Multilingual websites
White House
